Khanian is a small village in the north of Kaghan Valley in the Mansehra District of Khyber Pakhtunkhwa, Pakistan. It is located on the right bank of the Kunhar River. It is the starting point for a trip to Kamal Ban Forest and Dana Meadows. There is also a resort in Khanian.

See also 
Kaghan Valley

References 

Hill stations in Pakistan
Tourist attractions in Khyber Pakhtunkhwa